Jamrag-e Shomali (also Romanized as Jamrag-e Shomālī; also known as Jamrak-e Shomālī) is a village in Howmeh Rural District, in the Central District of Deyr County, Bushehr Province, Iran. At the 2006 census, its population was 30, in 4 families.

References 

Populated places in Deyr County